Tokyo Joe is a 1949 American film noir crime film directed by Stuart Heisler and starring Humphrey Bogart. This was Heisler's first of two features starring Bogart, the other was Chain Lightning that also wrapped in 1949 but was held up in release until 1950.

Plot
After spending World War II in the Air Force, ex-Colonel Joe Barrett returns to Tokyo to see if there is anything left of his pre-war bar and gambling joint, Tokyo Joe's. Amazingly, it is more or less intact and being run by his old friend Ito. Joe is shocked to learn from Ito that his wife Trina, whom he thought had died in the war, is still alive. She has divorced Joe and is married to Mark Landis, a lawyer working in the American occupation of Japan. She has a seven-year-old child named Anya.

To stay in Japan after his visitor's permit expires in 60 days, Joe wants to set up an airline freight franchise, but he needs financial backing. Through Ito, Joe meets Baron Kimura, former head of the Japanese secret police. Kimura offers to finance a small airline business that will carry frozen frogs for export to North and South America, even though Joe believes Kimura is going to use the airline as a front, carrying penicillin, saccharine, and pearls. But as the army hesitates in giving Joe permission to open the business, Kimura shows him proof from the Japanese secret police files that Trina worked broadcasting propaganda for the Japanese, a treasonable offense since she was a naturalized American citizen married to an American citizen. When Joe confronts Trina with this evidence, she explains that she made the broadcasts only to protect her newborn baby whom the Japanese took away from her when she was in Oyama prison camp. She reveals that she was pregnant when Joe deserted her, and that Anya is his daughter. Joe wants to back out of the airline deal, but Kimura demands that he go through with it. To save Trina, Joe accepts Kimura's proposal and convinces Mark Landis to help him start the airline business before his visitor's permit expires.

Joe then discovers through American occupation authorities that Kimura actually intends to smuggle in fugitive war criminals-former senior officers of the Imperial Japanese Army and the leader of the Black Dragon Society-to start a secret anti-American movement. The authorities plan to apprehend them when they land at Haneda Airfield. But Kimura finds out that Joe had met with the Americans, and before Joe  flies to Korea, Kimura informs him that Anya has been kidnapped and will be freed only when the Japanese are delivered at a certain deadline. Joe picks up his passengers and is about to land them at the Army-designated airfield when the Japanese hijack the plane with guns and land at a different airstrip in Okuma. The US Army intercepts the Japanese before they can be driven away, as they had every airstrip on Honshu covered.

Back at the bar, Joe finds out from mortally wounded Ito that Anya is being held in a basement at the old hotel next door. Joe enters the dark cavern and finds Anya, but he is shot by Kimura as he carries Anya to safety. Arriving American soldiers kill Kimura. Joe, seriously wounded, is carried out on a stretcher.

Cast
From The Films of Humphrey Bogart:
 Humphrey Bogart as Joseph 'Joe' Barrett
 Alexander Knox as Mark Landis
 Florence Marly as Trina Pechinkov Landis
 Sessue Hayakawa as Baron Kimura 
 Jerome Courtland as Danny
 Gordon Jones as Idaho
 Teru Shimada as Ito
 Hideo Mori as Kanda
 Charles Meredith as General Ireton 
 Rhys Williams as Colonel Dahlgren
 Lora Lee Michel as Anya, Trina's daughter
Uncredited:
 Kyoko Kamo as Nani-San
 Gene Gondo as Kamikaze
 Harold Goodwin as Major J.F.X. Loomis
 James Cardwell as Military Police Captain
 Frank Kumagai as Truck Driver
 Tetsu Komai as Lt. Gen. "The Butcher" Takenobu
 Otto Han as Hara
 Yosan Tsuruta as Goro
 Hugh Beaumont as Provost Marshal Major

Production

The film was Sessue Hayakawa's first postwar project and served as a revitalization of his career. From 1937 to 1949, Hayakawa had been in France, first as an actor and then was caught up in the German occupation, living ostensibly as an artist, selling watercolors. After joining the French underground, he aided Allied flyers during the war. When Humphrey Bogart's production company tracked him down to offer him a role in Tokyo Joe, the American Consulate investigated Hayakawa's activities during the war before issuing a work permit.

Principal filming for Tokyo Joe took place from January 4 to the end of February 1949 on the Columbia Pictures studio lot, not on location in Tokyo, Japan. A second photographic unit was dispatched by Columbia to Tokyo to collect exterior scene shots and was the first movie company allowed to film in postwar Japan. The use of a Lockheed Hudson bomber converted into cargo hauling is featured with both interiors, and aerial sequences revolving around the aircraft.

Reception
The film fared well with the public as the subject of postwar Japan was an intriguing one featured in many of the headlines of the day. Most viewers were convinced that the film was a semi-documentary due to the extensive use of footage shot in Japan. The critics were less charitable, The New York Times contemporary review noted the juxtaposition of the footage as jarring: "a note of reality which is embarrassingly at odds with the major and markedly synthetic elements of the plot", further stating: "The big weakness of Tokyo Joe, however, is a script which does not neatly come together, but squanders its good points amidst a field of corn."

Tokyo Joe was released in VHS format for home viewing on August 17, 1989, by Columbia Tristar with a further DVD release in 2004.

References

Bibliography
 Hardwick, Jack and Ed Schnepf. "A Buff's Guide to Aviation Movies". Air Progress Aviation Vol. 7, No. 1, Spring 1983.
 Michael, Paul. Humphrey Bogart: The Man and his Films. New York: Bonanza Books, 1965.

External links
 
 
 
 

1949 films
American crime drama films
American aviation films
American black-and-white films
Film noir
Columbia Pictures films
Films directed by Stuart Heisler
Films set in Japan
Films shot in Tokyo
Films scored by George Antheil
Films with screenplays by Cyril Hume
American neo-noir films
Films produced by Robert Lord (screenwriter)
1949 crime drama films
Japan in non-Japanese culture
1940s American films